Tore Børrehaug (13 March 1944 – 11 February 1998) was a Norwegian football defender.

He played for Frigg and Lyn, becoming league runner-up with Lyn and cup runner-up in 1965 with Frigg. He represented Norway as an U19, U21, B and senior international.

References

1944 births
1998 deaths
Norwegian footballers
Frigg Oslo FK players
Lyn Fotball players
Norway youth international footballers
Norway under-21 international footballers
Norway international footballers
Association football defenders